Water skiing at the 2012 Asian Beach Games was held from 20 June to 22 June 2012 in Haiyang, China.

Medalists

Medal table

Results

Men's tricks
21–22 June

Men's wakeboard

Quarterfinals

20 June

Last chance qualifiers

21 June

Semifinals

21 June

Final

22 June

Women's tricks
21–22 June

Women's wakeboard

Quarterfinals

20 June

Last chance qualifiers

21 June

Semifinals

21 June

Final

22 June

References 

Official Site

2012 Asian Beach Games events
2012
Asian